Hadar Am (lit. Nation Citrus) is a moshav in central Israel. Located in the Sharon plain near Netanya, it falls under the jurisdiction of Hefer Valley Regional Council.

History
The moshav was founded in 1934 by Jewish immigrants from Lithuania and North America, and was initially named Herut America Gimel (there were two other settlements named Herut America - Herut America Alef (now Herut) and Herut America Bet (now Beit Herut)) after the organisation which helped them immigrate. In 1943 it was renamed Hadar Am after citrus trees which surrounded the village. The founders were later joined by more immigrants from the Netherlands.

Notable residents
Ofer Shechter

References

External links
Official website 

Moshavim
Agricultural Union
Populated places established in 1933
Populated places in Central District (Israel)
1933 establishments in Mandatory Palestine
Lithuanian-Jewish culture in Israel
Dutch-Jewish culture in Israel
North American-Jewish culture in Israel